In the mathematical study of logic and the physical analysis of quantum foundations, quantum logic is a set of rules for manipulation of propositions inspired by the structure of quantum theory.  The field takes as its starting point an observation of Garrett Birkhoff and John von Neumann, that the structure of experimental tests in classical mechanics forms a Boolean algebra, but the structure of experimental tests in quantum mechanics forms a much more complicated structure.

Quantum logic has been proposed as the correct logic for propositional inference generally, most notably by the philosopher Hilary Putnam, at least at one point in his career.  This thesis was an important ingredient in Putnam's 1968 paper "Is Logic Empirical?" in which he analysed the epistemological status of the rules of propositional logic.  Modern philosophers reject quantum logic as a basis for reasoning, because it lacks a material conditional; a common alternative is the system of linear logic, of which quantum logic is a fragment.

Mathematically, quantum logic is formulated by weakening the distributive law for a Boolean algebra, resulting in an orthocomplemented lattice.   Quantum-mechanical observables and states can be defined in terms of functions on or to the lattice, giving an alternate formalism for quantum computations.

Introduction
The most notable difference between quantum logic and classical logic is the failure of the propositional distributive law:	
p and (q or r) = (p and q) or (p and r),
where the symbols p, q and r are propositional variables.

To illustrate why the distributive law fails, consider a particle moving on a line and (using some system of units where the reduced Planck's constant is 1) let
 p = "the particle has momentum in the interval "	
 q = "the particle is in the interval "
 r = "the particle is in the interval "
We might observe that:
 p and (q or r) = true	
in other words, that the state of the particle is a weighted superposition of momenta between 0 and +1/6 and positions between −1 and +3.

On the other hand, the propositions "p and q" and "p and r" each assert tighter restrictions on simultaneous values of position and momentum than are allowed by the uncertainty principle (they each have uncertainty 1/3, which is less than the allowed minimum of 1/2). So there are no states that can support either proposition, and
 (p and q) or (p and r) = false

History and modern criticism 
In his classic 1932 treatise Mathematical Foundations of Quantum Mechanics, John von Neumann noted that projections on a Hilbert space can be viewed as propositions about physical observables; that is, as potential yes-or-no questions an observer might ask about the state of a physical system, questions that could be settled by some measurement.  Principles for manipulating these quantum propositions were then called quantum logic by von Neumann and Birkhoff in a 1936 paper.

George Mackey, in his 1963 book (also called Mathematical Foundations of Quantum Mechanics), attempted to axiomatize quantum logic as the structure of an orthocomplemented lattice, and recognized that a physical observable could be defined in terms of quantum propositions.  Although Mackey's presentation still assumed that the orthocomplemented lattice is the lattice of closed linear subspaces of a separable Hilbert space, Constantin Piron, Günther Ludwig and others later developed axiomatizations that do not assume an underlying Hilbert space.

Inspired by Hans Reichenbach's recent defence of general relativity, the philosopher Hilary Putnam popularized Mackey's work in two papers in 1968 and 1975, in which he attributed the idea that anomalies associated to quantum measurements originate with a failure of logic itself to his coauthor, physicist David Finkelstein.  Putnam hoped to develop a possible alternative to hidden variables or wavefunction collapse in the problem of quantum measurement, but Gleason's theorem presents severe difficulties for this goal.  Later, Putnam retracted his views, albeit with much less fanfare, but the damage had been done.  While Birkhoff and von Neumann's original work only attempted to organize the calculations associated with the Copenhagen interpretation of quantum mechanics, a school of researchers had now sprung up, either hoping that quantum logic would provide a viable hidden-variable theory, or obviate the need for one.  Their work proved fruitless, and now lies in poor repute.

Most philosophers find quantum logic an unappealing competitor to classical logic. It is far from evident that quantum logic is a logic, in the sense of describing a process of reasoning, as opposed to a particularly convenient language to summarize the measurements performed by quantum apparatuses. (However, others argue that they are logics and satisfy all the canonical conditions logicians require to call an abstract object a logic.) In particular, modern philosophers of science argue that quantum logic attempts to substitute metaphysical difficulties for unsolved problems in physics, rather than properly solving the physics problems.  Tim Maudlin writes that quantum "logic "solves" the [measurement] problem by making the problem impossible to state."

Quantum logic remains in limited use among logicians as an extremely pathological counterexample (Dalla Chiara and Giuntini: "Why quantum logics? Simply because 'quantum logics are there!'").  Although the central insight to quantum logic remains mathematical folklore as an intuition pump for categorification, discussions rarely mention quantum logic.

It is however important to note that in the context of work on quantum computation and quantum communication, the development of quantum logic is definitely regaining new territory. The historical development of quantum logical structures is proving useful to design new quantum logical systems that are fit to reason about the flow of quantum information. An example is given by the "quantum computational logics"  and "The Logic of Quantum Programs (LQP)". The logic LQP is a dynamic quantum logic used for the specification and verification of the correctness of protocols in quantum computation. Other recent directions show the relevance of categorical quantum logics for new developments in the field of (computational) linguistics.

Algebraic structure 
Quantum logic can be axiomatized as the theory of propositions modulo the following identities:
 a¬¬a
 ∨ is commutative and associative.
 There is a maximal element ⊤, and ⊤b∨¬b for any b.
 a∨¬(¬a∨b)a.

("¬" is the traditional notation for "not", "∨" the notation for "or", and "∧" the notation for "and".)

Some authors restrict to orthomodular lattices, which additionally satisfy the orthomodular law:
 If ⊤¬(¬a∨¬b)∨¬(a∨b) then ab.

("⊤" is the traditional notation for truth and ""⊥" the traditional notation for falsity.)

Alternative formulations include propositions derivable via a natural deduction, sequent calculus or tableaux system.  Despite the relatively developed proof theory, quantum logic is not known to be decidable.

Quantum logic as the logic of observables 
The remainder of this article assumes the reader is familiar with the spectral theory of self-adjoint operators on a Hilbert space. However, the main ideas can be understood in the finite-dimensional case.

The logic of classical mechanics 
The Hamiltonian formulations of classical mechanics have three ingredients: states, observables and dynamics.  In the simplest case of a single particle moving in R3, the state space is the position-momentum space R6. An observable is some real-valued function f on the state space.  Examples of observables are position, momentum or energy of a particle.   For  classical systems, the value f(x), that is the value of f for some particular system state x, is obtained by a process of measurement of f.

The propositions concerning a classical system are generated from basic statements of the form

"Measurement of f yields a value in the interval [a, b] for some real numbers a, b."

through the conventional arithmetic operations and pointwise limits.  It follows easily from this characterization of propositions in classical systems that the corresponding logic is identical to the Boolean algebra of Borel subsets of the state space.  They thus obey the laws of classical propositional logic (such as de Morgan's laws) with the set operations of union and intersection corresponding to the Boolean conjunctives and subset inclusion corresponding to material implication.

In fact, a stronger claim is true: they must obey the infinitary logic .

We summarize these remarks as follows: The proposition system of a classical system is a lattice with a distinguished orthocomplementation operation:  The lattice operations of meet and join are respectively set intersection and set union.  The orthocomplementation  operation is set complement.  Moreover, this lattice is sequentially complete, in the sense that any sequence {Ei}i of elements of the lattice has a least upper bound, specifically the set-theoretic union:

The propositional lattice of a quantum mechanical system 
In the Hilbert space formulation of quantum mechanics as presented by von Neumann, a physical observable is represented by some (possibly unbounded) densely defined self-adjoint operator A on a Hilbert space H.  A has a spectral decomposition, which is a projection-valued measure E defined on the Borel subsets of R.  In particular, for any bounded Borel function f on R, the following extension of f to operators can be made:

That subspace can be interpreted as the quantum analogue of the classical proposition
 Measurement of A yields a value in the interval [a, b].

This suggests the following quantum mechanical replacement for the orthocomplemented lattice of propositions in classical mechanics, essentially Mackey's Axiom VII:

 The propositions of a quantum mechanical system correspond to the lattice of closed subspaces of H; the negation of a proposition V is the orthogonal complement V⊥.

The space Q of quantum propositions is also sequentially complete: any pairwise disjoint sequence{Vi}i of elements of Q has a least upper bound.  Here disjointness of W1 and W2 means W2 is a subspace of W1⊥. The least upper bound of {Vi}i is the closed internal direct sum.

Standard semantics
The standard semantics of quantum logic is that quantum logic is the logic of projection operators in a separable Hilbert or pre-Hilbert space, where an observable p is associated with the set of quantum states for which p (when measured) has eigenvalue 1.  From there,
 ¬p is the orthogonal complement of p (since for those states, the probability of observing p, P(p) = 0),
 p∧q is the intersection of p and q, and
 p∨q = ¬(¬p∧¬q) refers to states that superpose p and q.

This semantics has the nice property that the pre-Hilbert space is complete (i.e., Hilbert) if and only if the propositions satisfy the orthomodular law, a result known as the Solèr theorem. The orthomodular semantics and syntax of quantum logic is due to, has a completeness theorem and it fails for the deduction theorem.

Although much of the development of quantum logic has been motivated by the standard semantics, it is not the characterized by the latter; there are additional properties satisfied by that lattice that need not hold in quantum logic.

Differences with classical logic
The structure of Q immediately points to a difference with the partial order structure of a classical proposition system.  In the classical case, given a proposition p, the equations
⊤=p∨q and
"⊥=p∧q
have exactly one solution, namely the set-theoretic complement of p.  In the case of the lattice of projections there are infinitely many solutions to the above equations (any closed, algebraic complement of p solves it; it need not be the orthocomplement).

More generally, propositional valuation has unusual properties in quantum logic.  An orthocomplemented lattice admitting a total lattice homomorphism to {"⊥,⊤} must be Boolean.  A standard workaround is to study maximal partial homomorphisms q with a filtering property:
if a≤b and q(a)=⊤, then q(b)=⊤.

Failure of distributivity
Expressions in quantum logic describe observables using a syntax that resembles classical logic.  However, unlike classical logic, the distributive law a ∧ (b ∨ c) = (a ∧ b) ∨ (a ∧ c) fails when dealing with noncommuting observables, such as position and momentum.  This occurs because measurement affects the system, and measurement of whether a disjunction holds does not measure which of the disjuncts is true.

For example, consider a simple one-dimensional particle with position denoted by x and momentum by p, and define observables:
 a — |p| ≤ 1 (in some units)
 b — x < 0
 c — x ≥ 0

Now, position and momentum are Fourier transforms of each other, and the Fourier transform of a square-integrable nonzero function with a compact support is entire and hence does not have non-isolated zeroes.  Therefore, there is no wave function that is both normalizable in momentum space and vanishes on precisely x ≥ 0.  Thus, a ∧ b and similarly a ∧ c are false, so (a ∧ b) ∨ (a ∧ c) is false.  However, a ∧ (b ∨ c) equals a, which is certainly not false (there are states for which it is a viable measurement outcome).  Moreover: if the relevant Hilbert space for the particle's dynamics only admits momenta no greater than 1, then a is true.

To understand more, let p1 and p2 be the momenta for the restriction of the particle wave function to x < 0 and x ≥ 0 respectively (with the wave function zero outside of the restriction).  Let |p|↾>1 be the restriction of |p| to momenta that are (in absolute value) >1.

(a ∧ b) ∨ (a ∧ c) corresponds to states with |p1|↾>1 = |p2|↾>1 = 0 (this holds even if we defined p differently so as to make such states possible; also, a ∧ b corresponds to |p1|↾>1=0 and p2=0).  As an operator, p=p1+p2, and nonzero |p1|↾>1 and |p2|↾>1 might interfere to produce zero |p|↾>1.  Such interference is key to the richness of quantum logic and quantum mechanics.

Relationship to quantum measurement

Mackey observables 
Given a orthocomplemented lattice Q, a Mackey observable φ is a countably additive homomorphism from the orthocomplemented lattice of Borel subsets of R to Q.  In symbols, this means that for any sequence {Si}i of pairwise disjoint Borel subsets of R, {φ(Si)}i are pairwise orthogonal propositions (elements of Q) and

Equivalently, a Mackey observable is a projection-valued measure on R.

Theorem (Spectral theorem). If Q is the lattice of closed subspaces of Hilbert H, then there is a bijective correspondence between Mackey observables and densely defined self-adjoint operators on H.

Quantum probability measures 

A quantum probability measure is a function P defined on Q with values in [0,1] such that  P("⊥)=0, P(⊤)=1 and if {Ei}i is a sequence of pairwise orthogonal elements of Q then

Every quantum probability measure on the closed subspaces of a Hilbert space is induced by a density matrix — a nonnegative operator of trace 1.  Formally,
Theorem. Suppose Q is the lattice of closed subspaces of a separable Hilbert space of complex dimension at least 3. Then for any quantum probability measure P on Q there exists a unique trace class operator S such that  for any self-adjoint projection E in Q.

Relationship to other logics 
Quantum logic embeds into linear logic and the modal logic B.

The orthocomplemented lattice of any set of quantum propositions can be embedded into a Boolean algebra, which is then amenable to classical logic.

Limitations 
Although many treatments of quantum logic assume that the underlying lattice must be orthomodular, such logics cannot handle multiple interacting quantum systems.  In an example due to Foulis and Randall, there are orthomodular propositions with finite-dimensional Hilbert models whose pairing admits no orthomodular model.

Quantum logic admits no reasonable material conditional; any connective that is monotone in a certain technical sense reduces the class of propositions to a Boolean algebra.  Consequently, quantum logic struggles to represent the passage of time.  One possible workaround is the theory of quantum filtrations developed in the late 1970s and 1980s by Belavkin.  It is known, however, that System BV, a deep inference fragment of linear logic that is very close to quantum logic, can handle arbitrary discrete spacetimes.

See also 

 Fuzzy logic
 HPO formalism (An approach to temporal quantum logic)
 Linear logic
 Mathematical formulation of quantum mechanics
 Multi-valued logic
 Quantum Bayesianism
 Quantum cognition
 Quantum contextuality
 Quantum field theory
 Quantum probability
 Quasi-set theory
 Solèr's theorem
 Vector logic

Notes

Citations

Further reading

Historical works
Organized chronologically

Modern philosophical perspectives

Mathematical study
 
 
 N. Papanikolaou, "Reasoning Formally About Quantum Systems: An Overview", ACM SIGACT News, 36(3), 2005.  pp. 51–66.  arXiv cs/0508005.

Quantum foundations
 D. Cohen, An Introduction to Hilbert Space and Quantum Logic, Springer-Verlag, 1989. Elementary and well-illustrated; suitable for advanced undergraduates.
   
 
 

Mathematical logic
Systems of formal logic
Non-classical logic
Quantum mechanics